Victor Henry Wells-Cole    (29 April 1897 – 8 March 1987) was an English first-class cricketer and British Army officer. Wells-Cole served in the King's Own Yorkshire Light Infantry during both world wars, in addition to playing first-class cricket for the Europeans cricket team in British India.

Early life and World War I
Wells-Cole was born at Lincoln to Gervas Frederic Wells-Cole and his wife, Mary Beatrice Brook. He was educated at Winchester College. From Winchester he attended Sandhurst, graduating in April 1915 and entering into the King's Own Yorkshire Light Infantry as a second lieutenant. Serving during World War I, he was promoted to the rank of lieutenant in April 1917, and was awarded the Military Cross in November 1917. He transferred to the Labour Corps in March 1918.

First-class cricket and World War II
By 1923, Wells-Cole was back serving in the King's Own, gaining the rank of captain in March of that year. He served in British India the following year, playing in a first-class cricket match for the Europeans against the Hindus at Lahore. He batted twice during the match, scoring 1 run in the Europeans first-innings before he was dismissed by Brij Lall, while in their second-innings he was dismissed without scoring by Jagan Mehta. After going wicketless in the Hindus first-innings, he took figures of 3 for 44 in their second-innings. Returning to England shortly after, he played minor counties cricket for Lincolnshire in 1924, making three appearances in the Minor Counties Championship. He was promoted to major in September 1935. He later served during the Second World War, during which he was promoted to the rank of lieutenant colonel in April 1942. He retired from military service in April 1952.

Personal life
Wells-Cole was married to Thomasina Scott Oliver, with the couple having one daughter. His brother, Neville Wells-Cole, was killed during the First World War. He died at Huntingdon in March 1987, at the age of 89, just a few weeks away from his 90th birthday.

References

External links

1897 births
1987 deaths
People from Lincoln, England
People educated at Winchester College
Graduates of the Royal Military College, Sandhurst
British Army personnel of World War I
King's Own Yorkshire Light Infantry officers
Recipients of the Military Cross
Royal Pioneer Corps officers
English cricketers
Europeans cricketers
Lincolnshire cricketers
British Army personnel of World War II
Military personnel from Lincolnshire